The 1972 Humboldt State Lumberjacks football team represented Humboldt State University during the 1972 NCAA College Division football season. Humboldt State competed in the Far Western Conference (FWC).

The 1972 Lumberjacks were led by seventh-year head coach Bud Van Deren. They played home games at the Redwood Bowl in Arcata, California. Humboldt State finished with a record of seven wins and three losses (7–3, 4–1 FWC). The Lumberjacks outscored their opponents 262–215 for the season.

Schedule

Notes

References

Humboldt State
Humboldt State Lumberjacks football seasons
Humboldt State Lumberjacks football